Toolson is a surname. Notable people with the surname include:

Andy Toolson (born 1966), American basketball player
Ryan Toolson (born 1985), American basketball player, cousin of Andy
Tanner Toolson (born 2002), American basketball player, son of Andy

See also
Tolson
Toolson v. New York Yankees, Inc., a United States Supreme Court case